Dabu is a town in Ruyuan Yao Autonomous County, Guangdong, China.

Administrative division
As of 2016, the town is divided into one community and seven villages: 
 Dabu Community
 Jiashui
 Yingming
 Chengtou
 Baikeng
 Wulian
 Wuying
 Pingshan

History
It was known as "Dabu Township" historically. In 1987, it was upgraded to a town.

Geography
The town sits at the southern Ruyuan Yao Autonomous County. The town shares a border with Luoyang Town to the west and north, Wujiang District to the east, and Yingde to the south.

The Huangdong River winds through the town.

Economy
The local economy is primarily based upon agriculture and local industry. The main crops are rice, peanut, bean and vegetable. Economic crops are mainly bamboo, pepper, and sweet potato.

The region abounds with tin, bismuth, tungsten, copper, pyrite, and manganese.

Demographics

As of 2018, the National Bureau of Statistics of China estimates the township's population now to be 13,873.

Tourist attractions
The Ruyuan Grand Canyon, also known as "Guangdong Grand Canyon", is a well-known scenic spot in Guangdong.

Transportation
The Provincial Highway S258 passes across the western town.

References

Bibliography

 

Divisions of Ruyuan Yao Autonomous County